The Battles of New Ulm, also known as the New Ulm Massacre, were two battles in August 1862 between Dakota men and European settlers and militia in New Ulm, Minnesota.  They were part of the Dakota War of 1862. The Dakota forces attacked New Ulm on two separate days. After the second attack, the town was evacuated.

Location
In 1862, New Ulm, Minnesota, had 900 residents and was the largest settlement near the Sioux reservation. After the Battle of Fort Ridgely, the town was seen as a tempting target for a Dakota attack. The topography of New Ulm presented an advantage for the Dakota, since the land rises some 200 feet out of the Minnesota River valley in two large steps (terraces), with wooded area to provide cover for an attack.

Background

In 1852, they were moved into a reservation on the Minnesota River. In 1858, they were swindled of half that land. In August 1862, when the government failed to pay the $1.4 million compensation provided by treaty, and its agents and politicians stole most of the supplies that the treaty granted.

When Chief Little Crow complained that despite stacks of provisions in clear sight, theirs by treaty, and that his people had nothing to eat, trader Andrew Myrick responded, "So far as I'm concerned ... let them eat grass or their own dung".  Minnesota political leaders, led by Governor Alexander Ramsey, in league with commercial interests, advocated expelling all Dakota from Minnesota.

First Battle of New Ulm 
On August 18, 1862, Dakota warriors began attacking civilians in Milford Township, Minnesota, killing 54 people and wounding many more. At the same time a recruiting party for Civil War volunteers left New Ulm, but was ambushed in Milford. The survivors returned to New Ulm to warn of an impending attack.

At first, New Ulm Sheriff Charles Roos assumed that only a few drunk Dakota were responsible and rushed with a few men to Milford. After finding mutilated corpses and being fired upon, Roos realized that the attacks were much more serious. After returning to New Ulm, he wrote to Ramsey for immediate aid.

In the meantime Franz Czeigowitz, a former Austrian soldier and town resident, had organized about 50 poorly armed citizens into a defensive militia.  The militia had 12 rifles; the rest of the men were armed with shotguns, other poor quality firearms and farm tools.  Roos soon turned over command to Jacob Nix, a veteran of revolutionary fighting in the revolutions of 1848 in Europe. The townspeople erected barricades on the streets and sent the women and children into three brick buildings.

The first attack came on August 19, with about 100 Dakota warriors firing on the city from the bluff behind the town. According to Sheriff Roos, they were led by Joseph Godfrey, a former slave who had taken wives from Little Crow's band and Wakute's village.

Under the command of Nix, a small number of civilians returned the fire. Later in the day, a thunderstorm discouraged the Dakota from continuing their attack, and there were no leaders present to give orders. The first attack ended with six settlers killed and five wounded.

Second Battle of New Ulm 
After the first attack, Charles Eugene Flandrau and a force of men from St. Peter and Le Sueur reached New Ulm. The detachment included doctors Asa W. Daniels, Otis Ayer, and William Worrall Mayo. Mayo and William R. McMahan of Mankato set up a hospital in the Dacotah House and Ayer and Daniels set up a hospital in a store across the street. 

Flandrau's forces were bolstered by about a hundred men from Mankato, two companies from Le Sueur, and militias from Brown County, Nicollet County, St. Peter, Lafayette, and New Ulm.  In all, Flandrau had about three hundred citizen-soldiers under his command, but most were poorly armed. Meanwhile, more than a thousand settlers were barricaded on New Ulm's main street.

On Saturday, August 23, around 9:30 in the morning, the Dakota began their second attack on the city. The defenders attempted to form a defensive picket line several blocks west of town.  The Dakota advanced in u-shape/ bullhorn formation, holding their fire until the defenders shot first.  The defenders quickly retreated in disorder to the barricades in the town center. The Dakota were superior in numbers and were able to encircle the entire town. Captain William B. Dodd, second in command, was killed near the log blacksmith shop while leading soldiers beyond one of the barricades. He was attempting to link up with a supposed reinforcement column which actually was a body of Dakota masquerading as militia.

At the climax of the second battle a large body of Dakota used the terrain to mask a large movement below the lower terrace to enter buildings flanking the barricades and thereby give devastating enfilade fire. Realizing the seriousness of the situation, Flandrau and Nix led a charge out of the barricades down Minnesota Street and swept away the advancing Dakota.

After nightfall, Flandrau ordered the burning of the remaining buildings outside of barricades. In all, 190 structures were destroyed, leaving only 49 residences for 2,500 people. The next morning, August 24, the Dakota reappeared, fired some harmless long-range shots, and then withdrew.  Flandrau convened with his officers later that day and decided to evacuate the city (despite objections by Nix and others), due to a shortage of ammunition and food and the outbreaks of disease.

On August 25, 2000 people, including 153 wagons, evacuated from New Ulm to Mankato, escorted by about 150 men; the group made it to Mankato without incident.

William Watts Folwell, a Minnesota historian, remarked, "This was no sham battle, no trivial affair, but a heroic defense of a beleaguered town against a much superior force."

Flandrau's forces at New Ulm
(Note several other units were under Flandrau's command {Captain H.W.Holley's Company of "Winnebago Guards"; Captain C.I. Post Company of "Fillmore County Volunteer Mounted Infantry"; Captain N.P. Colburn Company of Fillmore County Volunteer Militia; Captain C.F. Buck's Company of "Winona Rangers"; Captain D.L. Davis "Goodhue County Rangers"} served under his command at the Southern Frontier. 
 Captain Flandrau's Company:
 Killed: Lt William Ladd; Privates: Max Heach; Jerry Quane {?} {Indistinct writing};
 Wounded:Privates: Ed Andrews; W.C. Estlar; Wm Langharst; George Moser;
 Sick: Private: H.Harm
 Captain Bierbaur's Mankato Company:
 Killed: Privates: N.E. Houghton; Wm Nicolson;
 Wounded: Privates:Geo Andrews; F.M. Andrews; Patrick Burns;John Fassat; Adam Freundler
 1st Battalion Brown County Militia: {Company B under Captain Ignatz Reinartz Company served at New Ulm Sept 15 to Oct 15, 1862; Lt. Charles Wagner Company C "Irregular State Militia" of New Ulm served from Sept 15 to Oct 10, 1862. Private John Armstrong killed }:
 Captain Charles Roos Company "A":
 Wounded: Privates: John Peller; Louis Schmitz
 Captain Louis Buggert's Company {Brown County Militia}:
 Captain A.M Bean's Company {Nicollet County}:
 Captain William Dellaughter's Company "Le Sueur Tigers No 1":
 Killed: 1st Lt. A. M. Edwards; Private: William Luskey; Luke Smithson {Wounded and died}
 Wounded: Private: John Smith
 Captain A.E. Saunders's Company "Le Sueur Tigers No 2":
 Killed: 5th Sergeant Wm Maloney; Privates: M. Aherin; Wm Kulp;
 Wounded: Captain A.E Saunders {Severely}; 4th Corporal Thomas Howard {Slightly in hip};
 Lt. William Huey's Company "St Peter {Nicollet County} Guards:
 Captain Sidel Depolder's "Lafayette Company"
 Captain John Belm's Company of 11th Regiment/3rd Brigade/Minnesota Militia:
 Killed: Privates: Jacob Castor; Eagland; Julis Kirchstein; Malbeans Mayer; John C. Michaels; August Roepke; Leopold Senzke;
 Died of Wounds: Privates: G.W.Otto Barth; Adolph Stumple {Died in St Paul};
 Wounded: Privates: L. Fay; R.Fischer; Julius Guething; William Guething; George Guetlich;Hess; Hansmann; Herriman; :de:Daniel Schillock; August Westphal;

In August 1862, the following units relieved New Ulm:
 Captain Joseph Anderson Company of Mounted Men "The Cullen Guard"
 Captain E/St. Julian Cox Company of "The Frontier Avengers"
September 1862:
1st Battalion Brown County Militia:
 Captain Ignatz Reinartz Company "B" served at New Ulm Sept 15 to Oct 15, 1862;
 Lt. Charles Wagner Company C "Irregular State Militia" of New Ulm served from Sept 15 to Oct 10, 1862. Casualty: Private John Armstrong killed.

References

Sources

External links
 Colonel Flandrau account of Dakota War – for Battle of New Ulm, see pp. 732–733

Battles of the Dakota War of 1862
Battles of the Trans-Mississippi Theater of the American Civil War
Battles of the American Civil War in Minnesota
Brown County, Minnesota
August 1862 events